Winifred Mary Johnson (born 7 November 1924) is an English former cricketer who played primarily as a right-arm pace bowler. She appeared in 10 Test matches for England between 1949 and 1954. She played domestic cricket for Yorkshire.

Johnson was also a PE teacher, employed at the Arnold School for Girls in Blackpool.

References

External links

1924 births
Living people
Cricketers from Kingston upon Hull
England women Test cricketers
Yorkshire women cricketers
Schoolteachers from Lancashire

ta:மேரி ஜான்சன்